Alone for Christmas (also known as Bone Alone) is a 2013 comedy film created by the independent film group The Asylum. A "loose mockbuster" of hit film series Home Alone, the film is directed by Joseph J. Lawson, written by Nancy Leopardi. It stars David DeLuise, Kim Little and Davis Cleveland.

Premise
When a family visits Grandma's house on Christmas Eve, they leave their dog at home alone. When three thieves try to take the presents from under the Christmas tree, the dog must use every trick it knows to stop them.

Cast
 David DeLuise as Dad
 Kim Little as Mom
 Davis Cleveland as Dillon Mateo Rojas
 Gerald Webb as Columbus (voice)
 Natalie Jane as KC
 Kevin Sorbo as Quentin
 Jeremy Mascia as Jake Marcos Olea
 Jonathan Nation as Anthony Leandro Cejas
 Justin Hoffmeister as Rob Ricky Ricon (23)
 Hooligan as Bone the Dog 
 Bill Pomeroy as Bone (voice) (as William R. Pomeroy)
 John Kenward as Phil
 Torpedo as Columbus the Dog 
 Kevin Yarbrough as Cupcake (voice)
 Hitchcock as Cupcake the Dog

Release

The film was released on October 10. 2013.

References

External links
  "Alone for Christmas" at The Asylum
  

American independent films
2013 films
American Christmas comedy films
Films about dogs
The Asylum films
Films about animals
2010s Christmas comedy films
2013 independent films
2013 comedy films
Mockbuster films
2010s English-language films
2010s American films